Xanclomys is a small mammal from the Paleocene of North America. It was a genus within the extinct order Multituberculata within the suborder Cimolodonta and family Neoplagiaulacidae.

The genus Xanclomys, named by Rigby J.K. in 1980, is also known as Xancolomys. The identification is based on a single species, Xanclomys mcgrewi. Fossil remains were found in the Torrejonian (Paleocene)-age strata of the Swain Quarry in Wyoming (U.S.). Affinities are uncertain. There's perhaps a second, unnamed species.

References 
 Rigby (1980), Swain Quarry of the Fort Union Formation, Middle Paleocene (Torrejonian), Carbon County, Wyoming: geologic setting and mammalian fauna. Evolutionary Monographs, 3, vi+179pp.
 Kielan-Jaworowska Z & Hurum JH (2001), "Phylogeny and Systematics of multituberculate mammals". Paleontology 44, p. 389-429.
 Much of this information has been derived from  MESOZOIC MAMMALS: Ptilodontoidea, an Internet directory.

Ptilodontoids
Paleocene mammals
Paleocene genus extinctions
Paleocene mammals of North America
Prehistoric mammal genera